The 2022 season was the Carolina Panthers' 28th in the National Football League (NFL) and their third and final season under head coach Matt Rhule. They attempted to improve on their 5–12 record from last season and return to the playoffs for the first time since the 2017 season.
After a 1–4 start from the team, the Panthers fired head coach Matt Rhule, along with defensive coordinator Phil Snow. Rhule was replaced with defensive passing game coordinator Steve Wilks, who will serve as the interim head coach for the remainder of the season. After a Week 16 win against the Detroit Lions, they improved on their 5 win total from the previous 3 years. However, they were eliminated from playoff contention for the fifth straight year when they lost to the Tampa Bay Buccaneers the following week.

Offseason

Signings

Draft

Draft trades

Trades

Staff

Final roster

Preseason

Regular season

Schedule

Note: Intra-division opponents are in bold text.

Game summaries

Week 1: vs. Cleveland Browns

In the Panthers' home opener against the Cleveland Browns, they came close to winning, but the Browns were able to hold them off. Cleveland defeated Carolina 26–24, meaning the Panthers started off the season 0–1.

Week 2: at New York Giants

This was head coach Matt Rhule's first return to MetLife Stadium in 10 years, as he had previously served as the Giants' asst. offensive line coach under then-head coach Tom Coughlin in 2012, a season after the Giants won their 4th Super Bowl title. Things started poorly for the Panthers when, during kick-off, Chuba Hubbard fumbled the ball, and it was recovered by the New York Giants. New York ended up scoring a field goal on the ensuing drive. When Carolina got the ball back, they would fumble again and the Giants scored another field goal. In the second quarter, Eddy Piñeiro scores two field goals for the Panthers, tying the game. Baker Mayfield makes a complete pass to D. J. Moore in the third for a touchdown. The Giants answered back with a Daniel Bellinger touch down, tying the game at 13-13 going into the 4th quarter. The Panthers only scored three points in the fourth, while New York scored 6, giving the Giants a 19-16 win, dropping the Panthers to an 0–2 record.

Week 3: vs. New Orleans Saints

The game started off well for Carolina in the first quarter when New Orleans fumbled the ball. Marquis Haynes recovered it and scored a fumble recovery touchdown for the Panthers. Carolina led by thirteen points at the half after Eddy Piñeiro kicked two field goals in the second quarter. Early in the fourth, Mark Ingram scores a touchdown for the Saints, giving them their first points of the game. Baker Mayfield completes a 67-yard pass to Laviska Shenault for a touchdown. They tried for a two-point conversion, but it failed. With 8:19 to go into the game, Piñeiro kicked another field goal for Carolina. With 2:22 remaining, Marquez Callaway scores a touchdown for the Saints, though it wasn't enough. Carolina defeated New Orleans 22–14, snapping a 9 game losing streak and improving to 1–2.

Week 4: vs. Arizona Cardinals

The Cardinals end up being too much for the Panthers and defeat them 26–16. Carolina falls to 1–3.

Week 5: vs. San Francisco 49ers

The Panthers lose to San Francisco 15–37 and dropped to 1–4 on the year. This was head coach Matt Rhule's and defensive coordinator Phil Snow's last game with the Panthers, as both were fired in the days following the loss with Steve Wilks promoted to interim head coach.  In addition, Baker Mayfield, who had another disappointing performance, was benched in favor of P.J. Walker.

Week 6: at Los Angeles Rams

Carolina started the game off with a field goal in the first. Both the Panthers and the Rams scored touchdowns in the second, leaving them up 10-7 into the half. The Panthers went scoreless in the second half, while Los Angeles took control and scored 17. The Rams defeated Carolina 24–10. For the first time since 2016, the Panthers were 1–5. 
This was also the last game Christian McCaffrey would play in as a player of the Panthers, as he was traded to the San Francisco 49ers on October 20, 2022.

Week 7: vs. Tampa Bay Buccaneers

Carolina and Tampa Bay were both scoreless in the first quarter. With 35 seconds to go in the second, P. J. Walker made a 20-yard pass to D. J. Moore for a Panthers touchdown, putting Carolina up by 7 at the half. Chuba Hubbard scored a touchdown in the third, as Ryan Succop made a field goal for the Bucs in the fourth. Walker threw it to Tommy Tremble for a game sealing touchdown. The Panthers won 21–3 and improved to 2–5.

Week 8: at Atlanta Falcons

In a close game, the Falcons defeated Carolina 37–34 in overtime. The Panthers dropped to 2–6.

Week 9: at Cincinnati Bengals

In the first half of this blowout, Carolina was scoreless, in part due to poor play from Walker, who posted a 0.0 passer rating, while the Cincinnati Bengals scored 5 touchdowns, four of them from Bengals running back Joe Mixon. Walker was removed from the game in favor of Mayfield, as both teams scored 7 in the third quarter. The Panthers went on to score 14 in the fourth, and even though Cincinnati went scoreless, the Bengals kept their comfortable lead and won 42–21. Carolina fell to 2–7.

Week 10: vs. Atlanta Falcons

Carolina sought revenge against Atlanta in this Thursday Night Football game after losing in a heartbreaker 11 days prior. The Panthers got their chance, winning 25–15 and improving to 3–7.

Week 11: at Baltimore Ravens

Baker returned from the bench in a 13–3 low scoring affair that saw Carolina fall to 3–8.  This was also the last game he'd play for the Panthers, as Sam Darnold was healthy enough to return, and Mayfield would soon be released by the Panthers, signing with the Rams.

Week 12: vs. Denver Broncos

Darnold's first start in the season saw the Panthers beat the Broncos for the first time since the 2008 season in a 23-10 score.  The Panthers improved to 4-8.

Week 14: at Seattle Seahawks

Carolina defeated Seattle for the first time since 2015, winning 30–24. The Panthers improved to 5–8, and with a Buccaneers loss, also allowed them control of their own destiny, meaning they were guaranteed a spot in the playoffs if they could win out.

Week 15: vs. Pittsburgh Steelers

Mitchell Trubisky and the Pittsburgh Steelers were too much for Carolina, defeating them 24–16. The Panthers fell to 5–9, yet still maintained control of their destiny.

Week 16: vs. Detroit Lions

On Christmas Eve, the Panthers ran all over the Detroit Lions, beating them 37–23, as well as setting new franchise records in rushing yards in a game and total yards in a game. Carolina improved to 6–9, improving on their 5 win totals from the previous three seasons.

Week 17: at Tampa Bay Buccaneers

In a must win game, the Panthers visited the Buccaneers.  Despite holding a 14-0 lead at one point, the Buccaneers were able to recover and win 30–24. Carolina fell to 6–10, and were officially eliminated from playoff contention.

Week 18: at New Orleans Saints

The Panthers are able to hold the Saints to a touchdown and win 10–7. They finished the season 7–10, capping off the first season since 2018 the Panthers won more than 5 games.

Standings

Division

Conference

References

External links
 

Carolina
Carolina Panthers seasons
Carolina Panthers